A Dreamer's Tales is the fourth book by Irish fantasy writer Lord Dunsany, considered a major influence on the work of J. R. R. Tolkien, H. P. Lovecraft, Ursula K. Le Guin, and others. It was first published in hardcover by George Allen & Sons in September 1910, and has been reprinted a number of times since. Issued by the Modern Library in a combined edition with The Sword of Welleran and Other Stories as A Dreamer's Tales and Other Stories in 1917.

Like most of Dunsany's early books, A Dreamer's Tales is a collection of fantasy short stories.

Contents
"Preface"
"Poltarnees, Beholder of Ocean"
"Blagdaross"
"The Madness of Andelsprutz"
"Where the Tides Ebb and Flow"
"Bethmoora"
"Idle Days on the Yann"
"The Sword and the Idol"
"The Idle City"
"The Hashish Man"
"Poor Old Bill"
"The Beggars"
"Carcassonne"
"In Zaccarath"
"The Field"
"The Day of the Poll"
"The Unhappy Body"

Summaries

Poltarnees, Beholder of Ocean 
In this story there is a mountain of which, if any man climbs, they never return; many have promised to come back after looking over the peak, but none have returned. There is one woman whose beauty is such that (in theory) a man would come back if promised her hand in marriage. So a man is sent to look over the mountain.

Blagdaross 
A tale of several objects in a nursery coming alive.

The Madness of Andelsprutz 
A tale in which a man visits a city and engages in conversation with two men as to whether or not the city of Andelsprutz is dead or was never alive then one of the men tells a tale of the city and how all cities have souls; he knows because he saw Andelsprutz's soul and engaged in a conversation with her.

Where the Tides Ebb and Flow 
A story from the perspective of a dead body and what it experiences.

Bethmoora 
A narrator tells the background of the desolate and abandoned city of Bethmoora. The city was abandoned abruptly for mysterious reasons, possibly a warning from the gods, a message from an emperor, disease or the desert. Bethmoora is brought up again in the later story, The Hashish Man.

Idle Days on the Yann 
The narrator takes a river voyage down the Yann on the ship Bird of the River. The ship stops at Mandaroon, where the citizens sleep to prevent the gods from dying and dreaming to end; Astahahn, where citizens use ancient rituals to prevent Time from slaying the gods; Perdóndaris, a great trading city; and Nen, the last city on the river. The ship finally reaches the Gate of Yann: two narrow, mountain-high, smooth and pink marble cliffs that the river flows between into the sea. Departing, the protagonist knows he will not meet the captain again, because his fancy is growing weaker.

The Sword and the Idol 
A tale of early humans. Loz invents an iron sword and comes to rule the tribe. Generations later, when Loz's descendant Lod is chief, Ird introduces religion to the tribe in the form of the worship of Ged. A battle of wills between Lod and Ird ends with Lod giving the sword to Ird.

The Idle City 
Four short short stories told to gain entry to the Idle City.

The Hashish Man 
The narrator of "Bethmoora" meets a man at a party who has visited the city more recently with the aid of hashish. He tells the narrator the city was abandoned at the order of emperor Thuba Mleen of Utnar Vehi. He describes some of the horrors of Thuba Mleen before fleeing the party to stay ahead of the police.

Poor Old Bill 
A tale of a terrible pirate captain, whose crew maroon him. Unfortunately, while he lives his curses still have magical power, and prevent them from entering any harbor.

The Beggars 
A daydream of cheerful beggars in lordly cloaks, who find cheer and fortune in everything.

Carcassonne 
After a prophecy given to a king that he will never set foot in the city of Carcassonne, the heroes of the court vow to conquer the city, the location of which is unknown.

In Zaccarath 
The king of Zacarath calls for prophecies. The prophets foretell doom, but the king and all of his court hear only tales that tell of everlasting Zacarath. At the end the narrator finds a rock that may once have been part of the marvellous palace of Zacarath.

The Field 
The narrator finds a field of flowers that seems to have a malevolence about it. He questions a poet, who informs him it is a battlefield.

The Day of the Poll 
A poet kidnaps a voter on election day, and tries to get him to see the beauty and glamour in the world.

The Unhappy Body 
A story about a body forced to work for a living, while the soul strives for poetry.

Sources

External links
 
 

1910 short story collections
Fantasy short story collections
Short story collections by Edward Plunkett, 18th Baron of Dunsany